Sudden Elevation is Icelandic musician Ólöf Arnalds' third album. The album was produced by Arnalds and Icelandic-American composer Skúli Sverrisson. It is her first album recorded entirely in English.

Track listing
 "German Fields" - 3:50
 "Bright And Still" - 3:17
 "Return Again" - 3:50
 "Treat Her Kindly" - 2:50
 "Call It What You Want" - 4:04
 "A Little Grim" - 2:56
 "Fear Less" - 2:53
 "Numbers And Names" - 3:19
 "Sudden Elevation" - 3:56
 "The Joke" - 1:44
 "Onwards And Upwards" - 2:35
 "Perfect" - 3:41

References

External links
 Official Site
 Official Myspace
 [ Album on AllMusic]

2013 albums
Ólöf Arnalds albums
One Little Independent Records albums